Dhiman Ghosh (born 23 November 1987) is a Bangladeshi first-class cricketer. He represented Bangladesh through the age group levels, playing for Bangladesh A in 2003–04 and 2004–05, and appeared in Under-19 Tests and ODIs.  He played 14 ODIs and one T20I for Bangladesh in 2008.

Dhiman was born in Dinajpur.  A right-handed batsman and wicket-keeper, he has scored eleven first-class centuries. Also an occasional off-break bowler, his best spell of bowling in first-class cricket was four wickets for 46 runs.

He made his full international debut in a One Day International against South Africa in Chittagong in March 2008, and became the first-choice wicketkeeper for Bangladesh for most of the year ahead of Mushfiqur Rahim, although Mushfiqur returned for the 2008 Asia Cup matches.  Dhiman played in one T20 International against Pakistan in April 2008, and in ODI series against Ireland, Pakistan and Australia, and played his most recent ODI in September 2008.  He was dropped when Mushfiqur returned to form, and gave up his international career when he signed for the Dhaka Warriors in the Indian Cricket League.

He was banned for 10 years by the Bangladesh Cricket Board for participating in the "rebel" tournament, but along with other Bangladeshi players left the ICL in 2009 after an amnesty was offered.  He has continued to play domestic cricket in Bangladesh, but has not been selected for the national team since 2008.

References

1987 births
Bangladeshi cricketers
Bangladesh One Day International cricketers
Bangladesh Twenty20 International cricketers
Chittagong Division cricketers
Rangpur Riders cricketers
Dhaka Dominators cricketers
Rangpur Division cricketers
Comilla Victorians cricketers
Khulna Tigers cricketers
Victoria Sporting Club cricketers
Mohammedan Sporting Club cricketers
ICL Bangladesh XI cricketers
Dhaka Warriors cricketers
Bangladesh North Zone cricketers
Bangladesh East Zone cricketers
Bangladesh Central Zone cricketers
Bangladesh under-23 cricketers
Bangladeshi Hindus
Living people
Agrani Bank Cricket Club cricketers
Wicket-keepers
People from Dinajpur District, Bangladesh